Vicomte Edmond Marie Félix de Boislecomte (28 April 1849, Arras - 1923, Arras) was a French painter of genre and historical scenes.

Biography 
He was awarded a law degree in Paris in 1871. Later, he studied at the Académie Julian, in the studios of Jean-Paul Laurens and 

He was married to Marguerite de Marbot, the granddaughter of General Marbot.

In 1879, he began exhibiting historical and Orientalist scenes at the annual Salon. 

References

External links 

1849 births
1923 deaths
19th-century French painters
French genre painters
French history painters
French orientalists
People from Arras
20th-century French painters